Manop Leeprasansakul (born 4 November 1956) is a Thai sports shooter. He competed in two events at the 1984 Summer Olympics.

References

1956 births
Living people
Manop Leeprasansakul
Manop Leeprasansakul
Shooters at the 1984 Summer Olympics
Place of birth missing (living people)